China Cry is a 1990 American biographical film set during rise of the communist state in China, based on the book by Nora Lam. It is set in the 1950s based on the true story of Sung Neng Yee. Born into a wealthy Chinese family, she is first eager to become part of Mao Zedong's "new society". But the Maoist regime brings hardship and misery to her family. She is arrested by authorities, and she believes that only Jesus Christ must have saved her when she survived a firing squad. She is taken to a labour camp while pregnant, but survives to take her children and family to freedom, being granted after she sent from the Labour Camp in Shanghai three copies of the same telegram to the Chairman, Prime Minister Chu & Beijing Police Headquarter. The film was directed by James F. Collier, and is an example of positive Asian characters in a Christian-themed film.

References

External links 
 
 

1990 films
British biographical films
Films about Christianity
Films directed by James F. Collier
1990s English-language films
1990s British films